Nicholas Davey (born 8 August 1950) is a British philosopher and professor of philosophy at the University of Dundee. He is known for his expertise in aesthetics, hermeneutics, and his work on Hans-Georg Gadamer. Davey has also played a leading role in founding several research groups and institutes at the University of Dundee, which include Theoros, Hermeneutica Scotia (research groups), and the university's Arts and Humanities Research Institute.

Davey is an active member of the Scottish Centre for Continental Philosophy.

Books 

 Unfinished Worlds. Hermeneutics, Aesthetics and Gadamer. Edinburgh: Edinburgh University Press, 2013. 
 Unquiet Understanding: Gadamer's Philosophical Hermeneutics. New York: SUNY Press, 2007.

Book chapters 

 "Hermeneutics, Structuralism, and Poststructuralism." In The Routledge Companion to Hermeneutics, edited by Jeff Malpas and Hans-Helmut Gander, pp. 600–611. New York: Routledge, 2017. 
 “Hermeneutics, Art and Transcendence.” In Gadamer’s Hermeneutics and the Art of Conversation (International Studies in Hermeneutics and Phenomenology), edited by A. Wiercinski,  pp. 371–382. Berlin: Lit Verlag, 2011.
 “Getting the Measure: Language and Reasoning in Philosophical Hermeneutics.” In Internationales Jahrbuch für Hermeneutik, pp. 123 –142. Tübingen: Mohr/Siebeck, 2011.
 “Philosophy Research and the Quest for the Unpredictable.” In The Public Value of the Humanities, edited by Jonathan Bate, pp. 303–312. Bloomsbury Academic, 2011.  [see reviews in THES 24 March 2011, p. 29 and Financial Times, 24 February 2012].
 “Language and Reason in Philosophical Hermeneutics”, Studia Humanitatis: Ars Hermeneutica, 2011, 61-84
 “Philosophical Hermeneutics, An Education for All Seasons”, in Education, Dialogue and Hermeneutics, ed. by Paul Fairfield (London: Continuum, 2011), pp. 39–60.
 “Truth, Method and Transcendence.” In Consequences of Hermeneutics, ed. by Malpas and Zabala, pp. 25–44. Illinois: North Western University Press, 2010. 
 “Written in Stone; Reflections on Word and Image." In Internationales Jahrbuch für Hermeneutik, edited by Gunter Figal. Tübingen: Mohr/Siebeck, 2009.
 Essays on “Baumgarten,” “Aesthetic Relativism” and "Gilles Deleuze." In Blackwell Companion for Aesthetics, pp. 234–238. London: Wiley-Blackwells, 2009.
 "Hermeneutical Application: A Dialogical Approach to the Art Theory Question." Internationales Jahrbuch für Hermeneutik, edited by Gunter Figal, pp. 93–107.Tübingen: Mohr/Siebeck, 2008.

Articles 

 "Critical Excess and the Reasonableness of Interpretation", Internationales Jahrbuch für Hermeneutik (2013).
 "Aesthetic Reasoning: A Hermeneutic Approach", Nordic Journal for Aesthetics (2012/2013).
 "Philosophical Hermeneutics, Art and the Language of Art", Aesthetic Pathways, 1:1 (2010), 4–29.
 "Hume i Nietzsche o jazni i tozsamosc", trans. by Dawid Misztal, Nowa Krytyka, 20-21 (2006), 149–172.
 "Lest we Forget: The Question of Being and Philosophical Hermeneutics", Journal of the British Society for Phenomenology, 40:3 (2009), 239–254.
 "Editorial", Journal of the British Society for Phenomenology, 40:3 (2009), 234–238.
 "On the Polity of Experience: Towards a Hermeneutics of Attentiveness", Renascence, 56:4 (2004), 217–234.
 "Aesthetic F(r)ictions", Journal of Visual Art Practice, 4:2&3 (2005), 135–149.
 "Sitting Uncomfortably: Gadamer's Approach to Portraiture", Journal of the British Society for Phenomenology, 34:3 (2003), 231–246.
 “Arts Enigma: Adorno and Iser On Interpretation”, Existentia, 12:1-2 (2003), 155–168.
 “Hermeneutics and the Challenge of Writing: Gadamer and Cixous on Speaking and Writing", Journal of the British Society for Phenomenology”, 33:3,(2002), 299–316.

References

External links
 Nicholas Davey at University of Dundee
 Nicholas Davey at Google Scholar
 Christopher Watkin on Davey's book, Unfinished Worlds

1950 births
Living people
20th-century British philosophers
21st-century British philosophers
Academics of the University of Dundee
Alumni of the University of York
Alumni of the University of Sussex
21st-century British male writers
20th-century British male writers